Bill, Will, Willy, Willie or William Klein may refer to:

William Klein (photographer) (1928–2022), American-French photojournalist and filmmaker
Will Klein (baseball) (born 1999), pitcher in the Kansas City Royals organization
Willie Klein (1901–1957), American champion golfer
Willy Klein (1912–2004), Luxembourgian Olympic gymnast in 1936
Bill Klein (businessman) (born 1948), American high-stakes poker champion
Bill Klein, American football end in 1950 NFL Draft
Bill Klein, American businessman on 2009 TV reality series The Little Couple

See also
William G. Kline (1882—after 1942), American football, baseball and basketball coach
William Klyne (1913–1977), English organic chemist and academic, a/k/a Bill Klyne
William Cline (disambiguation)